Cameron Heights is a neighbourhood in west Edmonton, Alberta, Canada overlooking the North Saskatchewan River valley.

It is bounded on the south by Anthony Henday Drive, on the north and west by a ravine, and on the east by the North Saskatchewan River valley. It is named for former school board member and Edmonton Town Council alderman John Cameron. The neighbourhood of Wedgewood Heights is located on the north side of the ravine.

The only roadway into the neighbourhood is Cameron Heights Drive from the south.  The Anthony Henday provides access to destinations to the south of the city including the Edmonton International Airport.

Demographics 

Surrounding neighbourhoods

References 

Neighbourhoods in Edmonton